The Bernstorfer pond is a 1900 metres large and 200 to 500 metres wide piece of the Niendorfer pond in Mecklenburg-Vorpommern. Both ponds are part of the lake Schaalsee. The municipality Kneese is located close to this lake.

Lakes of Schleswig-Holstein